Bavikonda Buddhist Complex lies about 16 km from Visakhapatnam, in the Indian state of Andhra Pradesh, on a hill about 130 metres above mean sea level. The term Bavikonda in Telugu means a hill of wells. As per its name, Bavikonda is a hill which has wells for the collection of rainwater. Bavikonda Monastic ruins dates back to the 3rd century BCE.

A large Buddhist complex was excavated at this site. The excavated remnants are as follows: 
A piece of bone stored in an urn, supposed to be one of the remains of the Buddha,
Inscriptions,
Pottery,
Relic caskets,
Tiles,
Bricks,
Coins etc.
were recovered here by the State archaeological Department.

The Buddhist sites of Thotlakonda and Pavurallakonda are situated close by.

The Indian National Trust for Arts and Cultural Heritage (INTACH) has already appealed to the authorities to ensure better protection of Buddhist sites by taking up the declaration of Bavikonda, Thotlakonda, Pavurallakonda and Bojjannakonda as heritage sites by UNESCO. This will not only pave the way for steady flow of funds but also generate employment opportunities for the locals.

Gallery

References

External links

Buddhist sites in Andhra Pradesh
Stupas in India
Archaeological sites in Andhra Pradesh
Tourist attractions in Visakhapatnam
Buildings and structures in Visakhapatnam district